East Bayfront, or the East Bayfront Precinct, is an emerging neighbourhood in Toronto, Ontario, Canada. It is currently undergoing a transformation from industrial use to mixed-use as part of Waterfront Toronto's plans to create a residential and commercial district urban core near the lake.

The area is bordered by the Parliament Street to the east, Jarvis Street and the Jarvis Slip to the west, and the rail line and Gardiner Expressway to the north.

The area was filled in during the 19th and 20th Century to accommodate growth of business needing access to the waterfront.

History
The district is mostly concrete with very few trees or greenspace. The Water's Edge Promenade will provide tree line board walk to the area. Sugar Beach (opened in 2010) and the Sherbourne Common will provide some green space. The area's revitalization is being managed by Waterfront Toronto, a partnership of Federal, Provincial and local governments encouraging progressive and sustainable development of the Toronto waterfront.

Several docking facilities for tour boats operating in the inner harbour in the east and west ends of the District. A number of small industrial-commercial business parks dots the area, but some are being demolished and replaced with parking lots. There are four privately owned public parking lots in the district.

The area has gone through redevelopment in the early 21st century, with several new amenities and attractions opening in the neighbourhood including:
 Water's Edge Promenade - a tree lined boardwalk from Jarvis to Sherbourne
 Parkside - Great Gulf Group 36 floor condo project designed by Moshe Safdie
 Bayside - city owned land for planned residential, cultural and retail development
 Parliament Wavedeck - mixed use public space/water treatment facility

 Corus Quay
 Corus Entertainment head offices
 Sugar Beach
 Sherbourne Common - a  park 
 George Brown College Waterfront campus

The area includes a  office and institutional zone on the dockside tract of East Bayfront. This section consists of the  Corus Quay and the George Brown College's Health Sciences Campus.

In December 2009, Waterfront Toronto revealed the first major private sector development for the district, called Parkside. The $200 million residential development project, designed by Moshe Safdie and developed by Great Gulf Group of Companies, will be located on the northeast corner of Queens Quay East and Sherbourne, south of the Gardiner Expressway and just east of the new Sherbourne Park.

In February 2020, the Université de l'Ontario français announced plans to open its campus in East Bayfront at 9 Lower Jarvis Street. The campus was opened to the public in June 2021.

Transportation
The Bayfront area is accessed by various roads and expressways:
 Queens Quay (Toronto) East - provides access through the centre of the precinct
 Lake Shore Boulevard East  - provides access along the northern end of the district
 Gardiner Expressway - forms northern boundary along with Lake Shore Boulevard East with on/off ramps at Jarvis and Sherbourne
 Lower Jarvis Street - forms western boundary; one of the few north-south routes connecting the area to the neighbourhoods north of the Gardiner
 Parliament Street - one of the few north-south routes connecting the area to the neighbourhoods north of the Gardiner
 Lower Sherbourne Street - one of the few north-south routes connecting the area to the neighbourhoods north of the Gardiner

There are a number of local routes in the area cut off by either Lake Ontario or the Gardiner:

 Freeland Street - named for Rand Freeland, owner of Fantasy Farm
 Cooper Street - likely for mill operator William Cooper (businessman)
 Richardson Street - named for Hugh Richardson (shipowner), Toronto's first harbour master
 Shaw Street - named for former Mayor John Shaw (Canadian politician)
 Bonnycastle Street - named for Richard H. G. Bonnycastle, founder of Harlequin Enterprises (now owned by nearby Toronto Star)

Most of these local routes exists to service local businesses and customers.

Plans by the TTC would see streetcar service in the district. Streetcars would run from Union Station down to Bay and Queens Quay, head east along the Queens Quay (southside) to Parliament Street. The interim terminus at Parliament will feature a loop, but the TTC plans to extend the route into the East Donlands in the future.

The Toronto Transit Commission has two bus routes in the precinct's west end:

 6 and 6A Bay - running along Queens Quay East, Freeland Street and Lower Jarvis
 75 Sherbourne - running along Lower Sherbourne, Lower Jarvis and Queens Quay East

There is no public transit in the east end of the precinct.
There are plans to develop a light rail line along Queens Quay, initially as far as Parliament Street.

Slips and quays

 Jarvis Street Slip
 Parliament Street Slip
 Pier 27

See also
 Port Lands
 Corktown
 Regent Park
 St. Lawrence Market
 Waterfront Trail

References

External links

 Waterfront Toronto

Neighbourhoods in Toronto
Redeveloped ports and waterfronts in Toronto
Waterfront Toronto